Chang Kim Wai (born 17 August 1976) is a former badminton player from Malaysia and coach.

Achievements

Southeast Asian Games 
Men's Doubles

Commonwealth Games 
Men's doubles

IBF World Grand Prix 
The World Badminton Grand Prix sanctioned by International Badminton Federation (IBF) from 1983 to 2006.

Men's doubles

References 

1976 births
Living people
People from Perak
Malaysian sportspeople of Chinese descent
Malaysian male badminton players
Southeast Asian Games medalists in badminton
Southeast Asian Games silver medalists for Malaysia
Southeast Asian Games bronze medalists for Malaysia
Competitors at the 2003 Southeast Asian Games
Badminton players at the 2002 Asian Games
Asian Games bronze medalists for Malaysia
Asian Games medalists in badminton
Medalists at the 2002 Asian Games
Badminton players at the 2002 Commonwealth Games
Commonwealth Games silver medallists for Malaysia
Commonwealth Games medallists in badminton
Badminton coaches
Medallists at the 2002 Commonwealth Games